In the context of combinatorial mathematics, stars and bars (also called "sticks and stones", "balls and bars", and "dots and dividers") is a graphical aid for deriving certain combinatorial theorems. It was popularized by William Feller in his classic book on probability. It can be used to solve many simple counting problems, such as how many ways there are to put  indistinguishable balls into  distinguishable bins.

Statements of theorems

The stars and bars method is often introduced specifically to prove the following two theorems of elementary combinatorics concerning the number of solutions to an equation.

Theorem one

This corresponds to compositions of an integer.

Theorem two

This corresponds to weak compositions of an integer.

Proofs via the method of stars and bars

Theorem one proof
Suppose there are n objects (represented here by stars) to be placed into k bins, such that all bins contain at least one object. The bins are distinguishable (say they are numbered 1 to k) but the n stars are not (so configurations are only distinguished by the number of stars present in each bin). A configuration is thus represented by a k-tuple of positive integers, as in the statement of the theorem.

The configuration will be determined once it is known which is the first star going to the second bin, and the first star going to the third bin, etc.. This is indicated by placing  bars between the stars. Because no bin is allowed to be empty (all the variables are positive), there is at most one bar between any pair of stars.

For example:

There are  gaps between stars. A configuration is obtained by choosing  of these gaps to contain a bar; therefore there are  possible combinations.

Theorem two proof

In this case, the weakened restriction of non-negativity instead of positivity means that we can place multiple bars between stars, before the first star and after the last star. 

Thus, we only need to choose  of the  positions to be bars (or, equivalently, choose n of the positions to be stars).

Theorem 1 can now be restated in terms of Theorem 2, because the requirement that all the variables are positive is equivalent to pre-assigning each variable a 1, and asking for the number of solutions when each variable is non-negative.

For example:

with 

is equivalent to:

with

Proofs by generating functions

Both cases are very similar, we will look at the case when  first. The 'bucket' becomes

This can also be written as

and the exponent of  tells us how many balls are placed in the bucket.

Each additional bucket is represented by another , and so the final generating function is

For the case when , we need to add  into the numerator to indicate that at least one ball is in the bucket.

Examples
Many elementary word problems in combinatorics are resolved by the theorems above.

Example 1

If one wishes to count the number of ways to distribute seven indistinguishable one dollar coins among Amber, Ben, and Curtis so that each of them receives at least one dollar, one may observe that distributions are essentially equivalent to tuples of three positive integers whose sum is 7. (Here the first entry in the tuple is the number of coins given to Amber, and so on.)

Example 2

Example 3

SAB2 allows for more bars than stars, which isn't permitted in SAB1.

Example 4 

If we have the infinite power series 

we can use this method to compute the Cauchy product of  copies of the series. Hence there are  ways to form our th power:

Example 5

The graphical method was used by Paul Ehrenfest and Heike Kamerlingh Onnes – with symbol ε (quantum energy element) in place of a star – as a simple derivation of  Max Planck's expression of "complexions".

Planck called "complexions" the number  of possible distributions of  energy elements ε over  resonators:

The graphical representation would contain  times the symbol ε and  times the sign | for each possible distribution. They chose the  4-tuple (4, 2, 0, 1) as the illustrative example for this symbolic representation:
εεεε|εε||ε

See also
Gaussian binomial coefficient
Partition (number theory)
Twelvefold way

References

Further reading

Stars and bars (probability)
Stars and bars (probability)
Articles containing proofs